New and Improved is the fifth album by American R&B group The Spinners, released in December 1974 on the Atlantic label.  Like the Spinners' two previous Atlantic albums, New and Improved was produced by Thom Bell and recorded at Sigma Sound Studios in Philadelphia.

History
New and Improved became the Spinners' third consecutive R&B albums chart-topper and reached #9 on the Billboard 200, their first top 10 album on this chart.  The album includes "Then Came You", featuring Dionne Warwick and the group's only single to top the Billboard Hot 100 (it was denied the top spot on the R&B chart by Kool & the Gang's "Higher Plane"), and the top 10 R&B singles "Living A Little, Laughing A Little" and "Sadie" – the latter track was covered by R. Kelly on his 1993 debut solo album 12 Play.

Track listing

Personnel
Billy Henderson, Bobby Smith, Philippé Wynne, Henry Fambrough, Pervis Jackson – vocals
Dionne Warwick – vocals on "Then Came You"
Linda Creed, Barbara Ingram, Carla Benson, Evette Benton – backing vocals
Tony Bell, Bobby Eli, Don Murray – guitars
Thom Bell – keyboards
Walter Pfeil – harp
Bob Babbitt – bass guitar
Don Renaldo – strings
Andrew Smith – drums
Larry Washington – congas, bongos
Jack Faith – alto saxophone, flute
Rocco Bene, Bobby Hartzell – trumpet
Joe DeAngelis, Milt Phibbs, Danny Davis – French horn
Freddie Joiner, Bobby Moore, Richie Genevese, Ed Cascarella – trombone

Charts

Singles

See also
List of number-one R&B albums of 1975 (U.S.)

References

External links
 

1974 albums
The Spinners (American group) albums
Albums produced by Thom Bell
Albums arranged by Thom Bell
Albums recorded at Sigma Sound Studios
Atlantic Records albums